James Shannon (died 17 October 1933) was an Irish Labour Party politician and trade union official. He was elected to Dáil Éireann as a Labour Party Teachta Dála (TD) for the Wexford constituency at the June 1927 general election. He lost his seat at the September 1927 general election having only served 3 months as a TD. He was an unsuccessful candidate at the 1932 general election.

References

1933 deaths
Labour Party (Ireland) TDs
Irish trade unionists
Members of the 5th Dáil
Politicians from County Wexford
Year of birth missing